Costus curvibracteatus is a tropical rhizomatous perennial native to Costa Rica and Panama. A member of the spiral ginger family of plants, its common name is orange tulip ginger. It is also sometimes referred to as spiral ginger; however, this common name is better associated with Costus barbatus, a more widely cultivated and very similar species. Despite the name and its relation to the ginger family (Zingiberaceae), the rhizomes of the orange tulip ginger are not edible.

Taxonomy
The first description of Costus curvibracteatus as a species was published by the Dutch botanist Paul Maas in 1976 in the Acta Botanica Neerlandica. The article, 'Notes on New World Zingiberaceae', described 12 new species in the genus Costus. The following year, Maas published a monograph on the Zingiberaceae, clearing up some taxonomic confusion and expanding descriptions, including that for C. curvibracteatus. In this and other early works, the genus Costus is placed in the family Zingiberaceae, subfamily Costoideae.  Following further classification contributions by botanist W. John Kress, the spiral gingers were recognised as a sister clade to the Zingiberaceae and moved to the family Costaceae, as originally suggested by the Japanese botanist Takenoshin Nakai in 1941.

Distribution and habitat
One record exists of the plant being found in the Chocó region of Colombia.

The plant is not uncommon in its native habitat and has been classified by the International Union for Conservation of Nature as being of least concern.

Habit and description
Coriaceous (leather-like texture) and dark green, the leaves are obovate to elliptic, with a cuneate to rounded base, and the apex is usually acute to acuminate.

Glossy, overlapping bracts form a terminal inflorescence, that is spike-shaped to ovoid. The bracts are red to orange, usually becoming more orange at the apex, which curves outward. During flowering, small, hermaphroditic yellow or orange tubular florets emerge among the bracts. They are usually about as long as the bracts but can be substantially longer.

Unlike its relative Zingiber officinale, the rhizomes are not edible, and it is not used as a spice.

Reproduction and cultivation
Costus curvibracteatus produces abundant nectar in its tubular florets and is pollinated by hummingbirds. Its seeds, by which it reproduces, are contained within glabrous, ellipsoid capsules, 10 to 17 mm long.

Only occasionally cultivated as an ornamental, it can nevertheless be grown successfully in milder climates if kept warm and sheltered in a shady location, with well-watered soil. It also grows well when potted and indoors. The plant can be grown from seeds, by first soaking them, or from cuttings of a mature plant.

Costus productus is more common in the ornamental plant trade, but is often incorrectly labelled as C. curvibracteatus.

References  
 

curvibracteatus
Flora of Costa Rica
Flora of Panama
Plants described in 1976